Onoe Shoroku II (二代目 尾上 松緑, Nidaime Onoe Shoroku, March 28, 1913 – June 25, 1989) is the stage name for Yutaka Fujima a Japanese kabuki actor who specialized in male roles.

Biography 
During his life he was designated a Living National Treasure of Japan and one of the country's four official leading actors.

Filmography

Film 
Banana (1960)

Television 
Hana no Shōgai (1963) – Ii Naosuke
Mominoki wa Nokotta (1970) – Date Masamune
Katsu Kaishū (1974) – Katsu Kokichi
Kusa Moeru (1979) – Emperor Go-Shirakawa

Honors 
 1972 – Living National Treasure
 1984 – Person of Cultural Merit
 1987 – Order of Culture

References 

Dunning, Jennifer (July 15, 1985). STAGE: AT THE METROPOLITAN, GRAND KABUKI'S 'SAKURA-HIME' New York Times

	

1913 births
1989 deaths
Taiga drama lead actors
Living National Treasures of Japan
Persons of Cultural Merit
Recipients of the Order of Culture